The Canton of Saint-Claude is a canton, situated in the Jura département and in the Bourgogne-Franche-Comté région of France.

Composition

Since the French canton reorganisation which came into effect in March 2015, the communes of the canton of Saint-Claude are:
 Avignon-lès-Saint-Claude
 Leschères
 Nanchez
 Ravilloles
 La Rixouse
 Saint-Claude (chef-lieu)

References

Saint-Claude